The Lowrey organ is an electronic organ named after its developer, Frederick C. Lowrey (1871–1955), a Chicago-based industrialist and entrepreneur. Lowrey's first commercially successful full-sized electronic organ, the Model S Spinet or Berkshire came to market in 1955, the year of his death. Lowrey had earlier developed an attachment for a piano, adding electronic organ stops on 60 notes while keeping the piano functionality, called the Organo, first marketed in 1949 as a very successful competitor to the Hammond Solovox.

During the 1960s and 1970s, Lowrey was the largest manufacturer of electronic organs in the world. In 1989, the Lowrey Organ Company produced its 1,000,000th organ. Up until 2011, modern Lowrey organs were built in La Grange Park, Illinois. In 2011, it was announced that production of a few models was to be moved to Indonesia.

History and notable users

History
Frederick Lowrey experimented with electronic organ design, trying different methods of tone generation, from 1918 until the early 1940s, when he fixed on the Eccles-Jordan circuit, a very stable flip-flop oscillator, which became a Lowrey hallmark. The Lowrey organ differed from its main competitor, the Hammond organ (which also bears the name of its Chicago-based inventor), in relying from its inception on all-electronic tone generation, whereas Hammond used electromechanical tonewheels until 1975. Lowrey led Hammond in the development of automatic accompaniment features; in 1968, automatic rhythm was added, and in 1970 the Genie model added automatic left hand and pedal. While originally intended for the home entertainment market, Lowrey also produced theatre organs and a full 2-manual with pedal church organ.

Notable users
New York studio musician Dick Hyman recorded several albums for Command Records on Lowrey organs, making use of their Stereo capabilities.

Eddie Baxter, organist for NBC Studios, recorded extensively for Dot Records on Lowrey organs.  He later traveled for the Lowrey company directly as District Sales Manager for southern California while still performing occasional concerts.

Lowreys were also used by some rock groups in the 1960s and 1970s. Garth Hudson, the keyboardist of The Band, played a Lowrey Festival organ on many of the group's most notable songs.
Its sound can be heard prominently on the 1968 recording of "Chest Fever", which begins with a Bach-inspired prelude/intro. The Lowrey Organ is one of several organs on The Beatles' 1967 song "Being for the Benefit of Mr. Kite!" (from the Sgt. Pepper's Lonely Hearts Club Band album), helping create a fairground atmosphere. Furthermore, a Lowrey DSO Heritage organ was used to produce the classic opening for "Lucy in the Sky with Diamonds". The Lowrey Organ and its built-in drum patterns are also heard on the million-seller single, "Why Can't We Live Together" by Timmy Thomas. A rather surprising use of a Lowrey Organ, on a percussive "marimba repeat" setting, was the synthesizer-like background noise on The Who song "Baba O'Riley".

Mike Ratledge of Soft Machine switched from a Vox Continental to a Lowrey Holiday Deluxe sometime between late 1966 and early 1967, and used it from then on, adding a fuzzbox and plugging it into a Marshall stack. To prevent feedback in the silences between notes (consequence of playing at a very high volume), Ratledge played solos in legato. Mike Oldfield made use of the instrument quite extensively on his Tubular Bells album, and on several later albums as well. The Gotye song "State of the Art" was written to showcase the sounds of the Lowrey Cotillion model D-575.

Adam Young from Owl City played a modified Lowrey spinet organ in the music video for the song "Fireflies".

Later models
From 1966 to 1971, Lowrey also produced combo organs for Gibson while the guitar manufacturer was owned by parent company Chicago Musical Instruments. The most popular of these was introduced in 1966 as the Kalamazoo K-101, but was renamed the Gibson G-101 shortly thereafter. The Gibson-branded organs' design and circuitry were similarly based on Lowrey's own "T-1" and "T-2" models, as well as their "TLO-R" and "Holiday" spinet models. However, they had several additional features that made their sound distinctive from other Lowrey models, including "Repeat", "Glide", and "Trumpet Wow-wow" effects.

In the late 1970s, selling features of Lowrey home organs included Magic Genie Chords, Track III Rhythm and the Automatic Organ Computer.

In the 1980s, Lowrey launched the MicroGenie series of portable organs with built-in speakers, some of which could run on batteries. They included the MicroGenie V60, V100/101, V105, V120, V125 and MicroGenie Pro V600 (which was programmable and had MIDI capability).

Purchase by Kawai
In 1988, Lowrey was purchased by Kawai Musical Instruments.

On October 5, 2018, Seijiro Imamura, Vice-President of the Lowrey Division of Kawai America Corp., announced that Lowrey Organ production would cease in January 2019.

See also
 List of Lowrey organs

References

External links

 Lowrey Organ

Electronic organ manufacturing companies
Musical instrument manufacturing companies of the United States